Released in November 1996, Fluorescences is an EP by the group Stereolab.  All four of its tracks were later re-released on the Oscillons from the Anti-Sun compilation.

The title track was voted number 20 in John Peel's Festive Fifty for 1996, and held the same position in 1997. A track would not usually be permitted to qualify for the Festive Fifty more than once; however, this result was allowed to stand.

Track listing
 "Fluorescences" – 3:23
 "Pinball" – 3:13
 "You Used to Call Me Sadness" – 5:10
 "Soop Groove #1" – 13:06

References

External links

1996 EPs
Stereolab EPs